The Trophée International was an elite women's professional one-day road bicycle race held between 1996 and 2001 in France. 

It usually took place the day before the women's Tour de France. In 1998, 1999 and 2001 it was part of the UCI Women's Road Cycling World Cup. 

The event was held in different locations each year: in 1996, in Pornic (Loire-Atlantique) ; in 1997, between Lac de Madine and Metz (Lorraine); in 1998, between Le Chapelle St Ursin and Saint-Amand-Montrond; in 1999, between Beauvois-en-Cambrésis (Nord-Pas-de-Calais) and Hirson (Picardy); in 2000, between Villeneuve-Loubet and Valberg (Alpes-Maritimes) and; in 2001, between La Brède and Pauillac (Gironde). 

The race was co-organised by Team France Organisation and Racing Club Olympique, who were also responsible for organising the Tour de France Féminin.

Past winners

References
UCI, results, 2001 (Archive)
cyclingnews, results, 2000
UCI, results, 1999 (Archive)
UCI, results and report, 1998 (Archive)
cyclingnews, results, 1997
cyclingnews, results, 1996

Recurring sporting events established in 1996
1996 establishments in France
UCI Women's Road World Cup
Cycle races in France
Recurring sporting events disestablished in 2001
Defunct cycling races in France
2001 disestablishments in France